Timothy Peach (born 25 July 1963) is a British / German actor. He appeared in more than seventy films since 1986.

Filmography

References

External links 

1963 births
Living people
German male film actors